Arthur Spjuth (1904–1989) was a Swedish art director who designed film sets for many Swedish productions.  He also directed five films and worked as a screenwriter on seven and a producer on two, as well as production manager on many others.

Selected filmography

 Comrades in Uniform (1938)
 Her Little Majesty (1939)
 Between Us Barons (1939)
 Life Begins Today (1939)
 The Two of Us (1939)
 The Three of Us (1940)
 A Crime (1940)
 The Bjorck Family (1940)
 A Real Man (1940)
 Heroes in Yellow and Blue (1940)
 Life Goes On (1941)
 The Ghost Reporter (1941)
 Little Napoleon (1943)
 The Girls in Smaland (1945)
 The Wedding on Solö (1946)
 Desire (1946)
 No Way Back (1947)
 Song of Stockholm (1947)
 Robinson in Roslagen (1948)
 Playing Truant (1949)
 Bohus Battalion (1949)
 My Sister and I (1950)
 Teacher's First Born (1950)
 My Name Is Puck (1951)
 One Fiancée at a Time (1952)
 Classmates (1952)
 Dance on Roses (1954)
 Darling of Mine (1955)
 The Magnificent Lie (1955)
 Mother Takes a Vacation (1957)
 We at Väddö (1958)

References

Bibliography
 Krawc, Alfred. International Directory of Cinematographers, Set- and Costume Designers in Film: Denmark, Finland, Norway, Sweden (from the beginnings to 1984). Saur, 1986.

External links

1904 births
1989 deaths
Swedish art directors
Swedish film directors
Swedish film producers
Swedish screenwriters
People from Stockholm

sv:Arthur Spjuth